This is a list of notable alumni, faculty and staff associated with Beijing International Studies University, or with its predecessor, the subsidiary foreign languages institute of Xinhua News Agency. Individuals are sorted by category and alphabetised within each category.

Notable alumni

Politics and foreign affairs

 Chen Jian, BA 1973, Spanish studies – vice minister of commerce of PRC
 Fan Xiaoli, BA 1979, Japanese studies – head of the United Front Work Department of the CPC Guangxi Committee
 Gao Hucheng, BA 1972, French studies – incumbent Chinese minister of commerce
 Li Jianhua, BA 1965, Arabic studies – counsellor of Chinese embassies in Syria and Egypt; officer at the Department of Asian and African Affairs and the Bureau for Chinese Diplomatic Missions Abroad, Ministry of Foreign Affairs
 Liu Chunxian, BA 1965, Japanese studies – Major General of the People's Liberation Army
 Liu Hongcai, BA 1972, Japanese studies – incumbent Chinese ambassador to North Korea; former Vice Minister of the International Department (IDCPC)
 Liu Zhentang, BA 1965, Arabic studies – former Chinese ambassador to Lebanon and Iran
 Qiu Xuejun, BA 1985, English studies – deputy director-general of the Department of Consular Affairs, Ministry of Foreign Affairs; former consul general of the Chinese embassy in the United States
 Wang Yi, BA 1977, Japanese studies – incumbent Chinese foreign minister
 Wu Sike, BA 1965, Arabic studies – incumbent special envoy to the Middle East; former Chinese ambassador to Saudi Arabia and Egypt
 Yang Chengxu, Nd 1962, training program – former Chinese ambassador to Austria; former chair of PECC China and CIIS President
 Yu Hailin, BA 1994, Arabic studies – officer of the International Department; titled China's Youth Excellence for Foreign Affairs in 2005, Beijing 2008 Olympic torch-bearer

Academia, arts and literature

 Simon Chesterman, Nd 1991, Chinese Language Exchange Program – dean and law professor at the National University of Singapore
 Liu Liqun, BA 1972, German studies – researcher at Chinese Academy of Social Sciences, director of China Institute for European Studies, director and secretary of China Institute for German Studies
 Liu Yueqin, BA 1974-1978, Arabic studies – researcher at Chinese Academy of Social Sciences
 , BA 2005, Chinese Literature, MA at Columbia University (East Asian Languages and Cultures) – cultural scholar and musician, member of American Pianists Association, China National Artist Association and China Association of Popular Music; having held solo concerts at Carnegie Hall in 2011, incumbent chief educational director and global cultural ambassador at U.S.-China International Development Network
Yang Jianhua (Peter Yang), BA 1971, German studies, MA 1979, German studies, PhD 1996 at University of Utah, German studies, PhD 2014, Ruhr University Bochum,  sustainability studies; associate professor of German and Chinese studies at Case Western Reserve University
 Yue Xiaodong, BA 1977, English studies – registered psychologist, professor of psychology at the City University of Hong Kong
 , BA 1972, German studies, PhD at University of Paderborn, German studies – professor of German studies

News and media 

 , BA 1972, German studies – director of Guangming Daily International, former chief correspondent based in Austria and Germany
 , BA 1971, Arabic studies – director and chief translator of China Radio International Arabic Channel; bestowed China News Prize, China Broadcasting Prize and China International News Prize; bestowed
  BA 1979-1983, Japanese studies – senior journalist, political commentator and writer; editor-in-chiefof the Hong Kong monthly magazine Panorama, former executive director at Ta Kung Pao; author of Hu Jintao, Wen Jiabao, etc.
 , BA 1971-1975, English studies – director and editor-in-chief, Xinhua News Agency Asia-Pacific
 , BA 2003, Arabic studies – news anchor of CCTV Arabic Channel
 , BA 1965, English studies – former deputy editor-in-chief and senior journalist of CCTV; contemporary artist and calligrapher, trustee of Chinese Poetry Academy and Chinese Calligraphers Association, entitled to the State Council Special Allowance since 1992; BISU BISU honorary professor of the Shan-Shui Painting Institute since 2004;
 , BA 1994, Arabic studies – host and journalist at Phoenix Television; former Xinhua correspondent to Gaza
 , BA 1964, Arabic studies – senior journalist at People's Daily International

Film, television and music

 , BA 1977, English studies – female Chinese-American film director, whose directorial debut Shadow Magic found huge response overseas and won 2 awards at Taipei Golden Horse Film Festival 2000
 Shu Chang, BA 2004, English studies – Chinese actress, singer, and television host
 , BA ?, English studies – one of the most influential music producers in China; he jointly formed the school band Wan Li Ma Wang when studying at the University, which is known to be the oldest rock band from China.

Sports and athletics

 Dong Fangxiao, BA 2004, English studies – former Chinese artistic gymnast, Chinese-NZ gymnastic coach
 , BA 2004, English studies – Chinese Xiangqi player; National Xiangqi Grand Master since 1998, National Xiangqi Champion Women Division in 2002 and 2004, World Xiangqi Champion Women Division in 2003 and 2005
 Guo Qing, MMgt 1999, Tourism Management – 29th Olympic Committee Roads and Transport Authority; COC Excellent Staff and Beijing 2008 Olympic torch-bearer
 Li Mingjia, BA ?, English studies – 29th Olympic Committee Communications Department, Beijing 2008 Olympic torch-bearer
 Liu Hongyu, BA 2004, English studies – Women's 20-Kilometre Race-Walk Champion of the 1999 IAAF World Championship, Spain
 Yuan Yanping, BA 2004, English studies – Summer Paralympic Judo gold medallist for Women's +70 kg in 2008 and 2012
 Zhang Jilong, BA 1972, English studies – Chinese football administrator, incumbent executive president of Asian Football Federation
 Zhang Yuning (footballer, born 1977), BA 2011, English studies – Chinese international soccer player

Business and services

 Chang Zhenming, BA 1979-1983, Japanese studies – chairman of CITIC Group, chairman and managing director of CITIC Pacific
 Gai Zhixin, BA 1974-1978, French studies – chairman and CEO of CITS Group Corporation, president and legal representative of China International Travel Service Limited, Head Office, and chair of China Association of Travel Services
 He Guangbei, B 1975-1979 – vice chairman and chief executive officer of BOC Hong Kong Holdings and Bank of China (Hong Kong)

Faculty and staff

Government, law, and public policy 

 An Yuxiang, adjunct professor at the Department of Korean studies – deputy director-general of Chinese Service Center for Scholarly Exchange (CSCSE); former counsellor of the Chinese embassy in South Korea
 Du Jiang, president 1999-2006 – vice chairman of China National Tourism Administration, former Beijing Municipal Commission of Tourism Development; President of China Tourism Academy, vice-president of China Tourism Association; entitled to the Chinese State Council Special Allowance
 Fu Hua, adjunct professor at the Institute for Transcultural studies – deputy secretary-general of Beijing CPC Municipal Committee
 , vice president 1964-1984 – administration officer of Beijing Railway Bureau; principal of Xinhua Foreign Languages Institute
 Li Chang (1914-2010), president 1964-1966 – former vice president of Chinese Academy of Sciences; former secretary of CPC Central Commission for Discipline Inspection
 , adjunct professor of tourism management, PhD supervisor – policy and regulations director, China National Tourism Administration, scientific committee director of China Tourism Academy
  (1915-2004), emeritus professor of English and Japanese linguistics 1973-? – former State Council Consellor

Language and literature 

 Chen Maoxin, emeritus professor of English studies – Lifetime Achievement Award in Translation bestowed by TAC
 Martin Forstner, adjunct professor since 2010 – professor of Arabic studies at University of Mainz; CIUTI President (1996-2006), CIUTI General Secretary (2006–present)
  (1926-2011), emeritus professor of French studies and English studies 1964-1994 – BA at Fudan (English studies), Lifetime Achievement Award in Translation bestowed by TAC, entitled to State Council Special Allowance; UNESCO advisor, translator for Zhou Enlai during the Geneva Conference; former editor/translator at Xinhua News Agency
 Huang Jinjia, emeritus professor of English studies -1988 – Lifetime Achievement Award in Translation bestowed by TAC in 2011
 Hannelore Lee-Jahnke, adjunct professor since 2010 – professor of translation studies at University of Geneva; CIUTI President (2006–present)
 Li Chuansong, emeritus professor of German studies 1964-, Institute for Transcultural Studies academic counsellor – BA at BFSU, German studies; Lifetime Achievement Award in Translation bestowed by TAC in 2009, entitled to State Council Special Allowance; former translator and interpreter at the China Council for the Foreign Cultural Relations (1955-1964), former trustee of Beijing Higher Education Academy
 Li Yueran (1927-2003), emeritus professor of Russian studies – chief Russian Interpreter of the CPC Central Committee; Lifetime Achievement Award in Translation bestowed by TAC
 Liu Yanzhang, emeritus professor of Russian studies – Lifetime Achievement Award in Translation bestowed by TAC
 Lv Guojun, emeritus professor of Russian studies and English studies – Lifetime Achievement Award in Translation bestowed by TAC
 Lv Longgen, Professor of Spanish studies – BA at Peking University (1965, Spanish Language and Literature), BFSU adjunct professor; Beijing Municipal Administration of Tourism Expert Committee since 2003
 Shi Meizhen, TEP Senior French Editor – Lifetime Achievement Award in Translation bestowed by TAC in 2009
 , emeritus professor of German studies 1964- – National Outstanding Lecturer titled by MOE in 1998; Lifetime Achievement Award in Translation bestowed by TAC in 2009, entitled to State Council Special Allowance; former trustee of China German Language Education Association and China German Literature Studies Association
 Su Qi, emeritus professor of Japanese studies – Lifetime Achievement Award in Translation bestowed by TAC
 Tang Lunyi, emeritus professor of German studies 1983-2006 – Lifetime Achievement Award in Translation bestowed by TAC in 2011
 David Noel Tool, professor of Applied Linguistics 2001–present – former U.S. army colonel; titled Capital's 10 Most Outstanding Volunteers by Beijing Volunteers' Association in 2006, Beijing 2008 torch-bearer 
 Wang Wenjiong, emeritus professor of English studies – Lifetime Achievement Award in Translation bestowed by TAC
 Wang Zhiyou, emeritus professor of German studies – Lifetime Achievement Award in Translation bestowed by TAC
 Zhang Daoyi, president of Beijing International Studies University 1983-1987, emeritus professor of English studies – Lifetime Achievement Award in Translation bestowed by TAC in 2009
 Zhang Zhihua, emeritus professor of Arabic studies 1973-1993 – Lifetime Achievement Award in Translation bestowed by TAC in 2011
 Zhao Huazhi, emeritus professor of English studies, TEP Senior English Editor – Lifetime Achievement Award in Translation bestowed by TAC in 2009

Arts and humanities 

 Chen Zhongyi, adjunct professor at the Institute for Transcultural Studies – director of the Foreign Literature Research Institute, Chinese Academy of Social Sciences
 Jia Yunfeng, adjunct professor of tourism management, professional doctorate supervisor – China media consultant for Government of Ontario, Canada, chief consultant of Chinese Taipei Tourism Association
 Liu Yida, adjunct professor at the School of International Communication – senior columnist and news reporter of Beijing Evening News; awarded the National Top 100 Outstanding Journalists
 Wang Keping, professor of Aesthetics and Transcultural Studies – director of the CASS Institute of Philosophy, vice chairman of International Society for Universal Dialogue; entitled to the Chinese State Council Special Allowance since 1998
 Yu Guoming, adjunct professor at the School of International Communication – associate dean of School of Journalism and Communication and director of the Public Opinion Research Center, Renmin University, China

Economics and business

 Ai Xuejiao, adjunct professor of business management, MBA supervisor – crisis management expert, EMBA Distinguished Professor at Peking University
 Hai Yan, or Si Haiyan, adjunct professor of tourism and hospitality management, PhD and Professional Doctorate supervisor – chairman of China Tourist Hotels Association (CTHA), SVP of Jinjiang International, CEO of Kunlun Hotel Group; bestowed 2003 Top 10 National Cultural Figure, the "most successful Chinese commercial fiction writer of this decade", member of China Writer Association
 Huang Deman, adjunct professor of hospitality management – chairman of Vienna Hotels
 Xiao Qianhui, adjunct professor of tourism and hospitality management, PhD supervisor – General Manager of Shanghai Spring International Travel Service Group
 Jeremy Xu, adjunct professor of tourism and hospitality management, PhD and Professional Doctorate supervisor – executive director and General Manager of China Travel International Investment Hong Kong
 Yao Wang, adjunct professor of international trade, PhD and Professional Doctorate supervisor – executive director of the Boao Forum for Asia; Vice President of China Academy of International Trade (CAIT), president of Beijing Academy of International Economy and Trade
 Ye Haihua, adjunct professor of tourism and hospitality management, Professional Doctorate supervisor – CEO of InterContinental Hotels Group Greater China
 Zhang Rungang, adjunct professor of tourism and hospitality management, PhD and professional doctorate supervisor – deputy general manager of Beijing Tourism Group, chairman of Beijing Capital Tourism Co., Ltd.

Athletics and sports

 Zhang Yan, PE Department 2007–present – taekwondo head coach of 2012 National University Games, taekwondo referee of 2011 and 2013 National Taekwondo Championship and 2013 National Games

Friends of BISU

Honorary faculty 

 , honorary professor – managing director of ESSEC Business School
 Chen Haosu, honorary dean of the School of English Language, Literature and Culture – the 8th chairperson of the Chinese People's Association for Friendship with Foreign Countries
 Karl-Dieter Bünting, honorary professor – linguist of German language, professor of University of Duisburg-Essen
 Duan Qiang, honorary professor – president of Beijing Tourism Group
 John Grant, honorary professor – deputy vice-chancellor of University of Canberra
 Jesús Fernández Hernández, honorary professor – president of the Fundación Fernando Rielo, Spain
 , honorary dean, Institute of China Translation Development – CPPCC National Committee, VP of the China International Publishing Group
 , honorary professor – president of Kyoto University of Foreign Studies
 , honorary professor – former president of Yokohama College of Commerce
 Alexander Radkov, honorary professor – head of the Federal Agency for Tourism, Russia
 , honorary professor – Ministerialrat for Ministry of Culture of Rheinland-Pfalz, Germany
 , honorary professor – president of Aichi Gakusen University
 , honorary professor – president of Beijing Foreign Studies University (1984-1997)

Notable figures on campus 

Compared to the personalities mentioned above, the people listed here are neither necessarily big names nor officially recognised. However, they are the indispensable of the campus and are among the most lovely figures in the mind of BISU students.

 Liu Tongyan – courier of Shentong Express serving at the North Gate of BISU, 2008-2013
 Zhang Zhongpu, ??-?? – former typographer of BISU Printing House, 1965-1980 (officially retired), 1980-1989

Bibliography

Notes

References 

Beijing International Studies University
 
Beijing International Studies University